Pilo Visual Tools for Scheme (Pvts) is a basic interpreter implementation with visualization tools of the Scheme programming language developed at  Rollins College. It is written in Java. PVTS contains an interpreter (also known as a read-eval-print loop) as well as three visualization modules: a global environment viewer, a function call viewer, and a data structure viewer.

Pvts is free software, licensed under the GNU General Public License (GPL), and is available online.

Limitations
Pvts has very limited interpreter capabilities. It does not cover the R5RS standard or any other scheme language standard. 
The purpose of this software is to display graphically Scheme code as an aid for students learning the language.

External links
 Pvts home page
 Pvts grammar
 Pilo Visual Tools for Scheme

Scheme (programming language) interpreters
Scheme (programming language) implementations